This is a list of massacres committed during the Syrian civil war.

2011
 Between 31 July and 4 August 2011, during the Siege of Hama, Syrian government forces reportedly killed more than 100 people in an assault on the city of Hama. Opposition activists later raised their estimated civilian death toll to 200 dead.
 Between 19 and 20 December 2011, a massacre occurred in the Jabal al-Zawiya mountains of Idlib Governorate. The killings started after a large group of soldiers tried to defect from Army positions over the border to Turkey. Intense clashes between the military and the defectors, who were supported by other rebel fighters, erupted. After two days of fighting, 235 defectors, 100 pro-government soldiers and 120 civilians were killed.

2012
 On 27 February 2012, during the 2012 Homs offensive, the Syrian Observatory for Human Rights reported that 68 bodies were found between the villages of Ram al-Enz and Ghajariyeh and were taken to the central hospital of Homs. The wounds showed that some of the dead were shot while others were killed by cutting weapons. The Rebel Local Coordination Committees reported that 64 dead bodies were found. The rebels claimed that the victims were civilians who tried to flee the battle in Homs and were then killed by a pro-government militia.
 On 9 March 2012, during the 2012 Homs offensive, 30 tanks of the Syrian Army entered the quarter of Karm al-Zeitoun. After this, it was reported that the Syrian Army had massacred 47 women and children in the district (26 children and 21 women), some of whom had their throats slit, according to activists. The opposition claimed that the main perpetrators behind the killings were the government paramilitary force the Shabiha.
 On 5 April, the military captured Taftanaz's city center after a two-hour battle, following which the army reportedly carried out a massacre by rounding up and executing people. At least 62 people were killed. It was unknown how many were opposition fighters and how many were civilians.
 On 25 May 2012, the Houla massacre occurred in two opposition-controlled villages in the Houla region of Syria, a cluster of villages north of Homs. According to the United Nations, 108 people were killed, including 34 women and 49 children. UN investigators reported that witnesses and survivors provided two conflicting narratives. The Syrian government alleged that Al-Qaeda terrorist groups were responsible for the killings, and that Houla residents were warned not to speak publicly by opposition forces.
 On 29 May 2012, a mass execution was discovered near the eastern city of Deir ez-Zor. The unidentified corpses of 13 men had been discovered shot to death execution-style. On 5 June 2012, the rebel Al-Nusra Front claimed responsibility for the killings, stating that they had captured and interrogated the soldiers in Deir ez-Zor and "justly" punished them with death, after they confessed to crimes.
 On 31 May 2012, there were reports of a massacre in the Syrian village of al-Buwaida al-Sharqiya. According to sources, 13 factory workers had been rounded up and shot dead by pro-government forces.
 On 6 June 2012, the Al-Qubeir massacre occurred in the small village of Al-Qubeir near Hama. According to preliminary evidence, troops had surrounded the village which was followed by pro-government Shabiha militia entering the village and killing civilians with "barbarity," UN Secretary-General Ban Ki-moon told the UN Security Council. The death toll, according to opposition activists, was estimated to be between 55 and 68. Activists, and witnesses, stated that scores of civilians, including children, had been killed by Shabiha militia and security forces, while the Syrian government said that nine people had been killed by "terrorists".
 On 23 June 2012, 25 local Shabiha policemen POWs were killed by Syrian rebels in the city of Darat Izza. They were part of a larger group of POWs captured by the rebels. The fate of the others POWs was unknown.  Many of the corpses of the shabiha militia killed were in military uniform.
 Between 20 and 25 August 2012, the Darayya massacre was reported in the town of Darayya in the Rif Dimashq province. Between 320 and 500 people were killed in a five-day Army assault on the town, which was rebel-held. At least 18 of the dead were identified as rebels. According to the opposition, Human Rights Watch and some local residents the killings were committed by the Syrian military and Shabiha militiamen. According to the government and some local residents they were committed by rebel forces.
 Between 8 and 13 October 2012, during the Battle of Maarrat Al-Nu'man, the Syrian Army was accused by the opposition of executing 65 people, including 50 defecting soldiers.
 On 11 December 2012, the Aqrab massacre, also known as the Aqrab bombings, occurred in the predominantly Alawite village of Aqrab, Hama Governorate. Between 125 and 200 people were reported killed or wounded, when rebel fighters threw bombs at a building in which hundreds of Alawite civilians, with some pro-government militiamen, were taking refuge from the fighting that had been raging in the town. Most of the victims were Alawites.
 On 23 December 2012, the Halfaya massacre occurred in the small town of Halfaya, where between 23 to 300 people were allegedly killed by bombing from warplanes. Reportedly, the civilians in the city of Halfaya were killed while queuing for bread at a bakery. BBC correspondent Jim Muir has noted that it is not conclusive from the video that the building was a bakery. He also noted that despite initial claims by rebels that many women and children were among the dead, of the 23 people identified as dead – all of them were men. Muir added: "it is not out of the question that regime jets managed to strike a concentration of rebel fighters."

2013
 On 15 January 2013, government troops stormed the village of Basatin al-Hasawiya on the outskirts of Homs city reportedly killing 106 civilians, including women and children, by shooting, stabbing or possibly burning them to death.
 On 15 January 2013, twin explosions of unknown origin killed 87 people at Aleppo's university, many of them students attending exams. The government and opposition blamed each other for the explosions at the university.
 Between 29 January and 14 March 2013, opposition activists claimed that they found about 230 bodies on the banks and in the Queiq river in Aleppo. They accused government forces of being the ones who executed the men since the bodies came down the river from the direction of government-held areas of the city. Human Rights Watch was able to identify at least 147 victims, all male and aged between 11 and 64.
 On 23 March 2013, an alleged chemical weapons attack was carried out in the town of Khan al-Assal, on the outskirts of Aleppo. 25–31 people were killed. Both the government and the rebels traded blame for the attack, although the opposition activist group the Syrian Observatory for Human Rights stated that 16 of the dead were government soldiers. According to the government, 21 of the dead were civilians, while 10 were soldiers. Russia supported the government's allegations, while the United States said there was no evidence of any attack at all.
 Between 16 and 21 April, during the Battle of Jdaidet al-Fadl, the Syrian Army was accused by the opposition of carrying out a massacre. SOHR claimed that 250 people were killed since the start of the battle, with them being able to document, by name, 127 of the dead, including 27 rebels. Another opposition claim put the death toll at 450. One activist source claimed he counted 98 bodies in the town's streets and 86 in makeshift clinics who were summarily executed. Another activist stated they documented 85 people who were executed, including 28 who were killed in a makeshift hospital.
 On April 16, 2013, Syrian intelligence forces massacred around 280 civilians in the Damascus neighborhood of Tadamon. The victims were individually led into a pre-dug mass grave and executed at close range. The victims included women and children. Further killings in the area are alleged. The massacre was not widely reported at the time, and only became known in 2022.
 Between 27 April and 5 July 2013, during the rebel siege of the Aleppo Central Prison more than 120 prisoners were killed. Most died due to malnutrition and lack of medical treatment due to the siege, as well as rebel bombardment on the prison. Some were also executed by government forces. On 1 June, during the siege, an opposition activist group claimed 50 prisoners were executed by government forces, while another group reported that, up to that point, 40 government soldiers and 31 prisoners had been killed in rebel shelling of the prison complex. On 7 February 2014, SOHR stated 600 prisoners had died since the start of the rebel siege of the prison. The death toll was updated to 800 by 15 April.
 Between 2 and 3 May 2013, the Bayda and Baniyas massacres occurred in which pro-government militiamen allegedly killed between 128 and 450 people in the Tartus Governorate, apparently in retaliation for an earlier rebel attack near the town that left at least half a dozen soldiers dead. State media stated their forces were seeking only to clear the area of "terrorists". In all, the military claimed that they killed 40 "terrorists" in Bayda and Baniyas. According to a UN report, between 300 and 450 people were killed.
 On 14 and 16 May 2013, two videos surfaced of the execution of government soldiers by Islamic extremists in eastern Syria. In one, members of the groups Islamic State of Iraq and Bilad al-Sham shot dead three prisoners in the middle of a square in Raqqa city, whom they alleged were Syrian Army officers. It was later revealed that two of the three killed prisoners were not Syrian Army officers, but Alawite civilians. One was a dentist and the other was his nephew, a teacher. The other video showed the Al-Nusra Front executing 11 government soldiers in the eastern Deir al-Zor province. That video is believed to had dated back to some time in 2012.
 The Hatla massacre occurred on 11 June 2013, when Syrian rebels killed 60 Shi'ite villagers, including some who were armed, in the village of Hatla, near Deir el-Zour. The killings were reportedly in retaliation for an attack by Shi'ite pro-government fighters from the village, a day earlier, in which four rebels were killed. According to opposition activists, most of the dead were pro-government fighters but civilians were killed as well, including women and children. Rebels also burned civilian houses during the takeover. 10 rebel fighters were killed during the attack. 150 Shi'ite residents fled to the nearby government-held village of Jafra. According to a UN report, 30 people were killed.
 Between 22 July 2013 and 31 August 2016, during the government siege of the Yarmouk Camp 187 people died due to malnutrition and lack of medical care.
 Ghouta chemical attack
 On 18 June 2013, 20 people were killed in a Grad missile attack on the home of Parliament member Ahmad al-Mubarak, who is also the head of the Bani Izz clan, in the town of Abu Dala. Opposition activists claimed that he was killed by government forces. However, Ahmad al-Mubarak was a well-known government supporter and one of his aids was executed by rebels a week earlier.
 On 22 and 23 July 2013, rebel forces attacked and captured the town of Khan al-Asal, west of Aleppo. During the takeover more than 150 soldiers were killed, including 51 soldiers and officers who were summarily executed after being captured. The incident was considered one of the worst mass executions by rebels in the war. Several executions of soldiers in the village of Hara in the province of Deraa were also reported.
 On 26 July 2013, 32 people, including 19 children and six women, were killed by an Army surface-to-surface missile fired at the Bab al-Nayrab neighbourhood of Aleppo city. The target was a jihadist base, however the missile fell short and hit civilian buildings.
 Between 27 and 30 July 2013, the al-Nusra Front and ISIL killed between 50 and 70 residents in Tell Aran and Tell Hassel after they captured the Kurdish enclaves from the Kurdish Front.
 During the 2013 Latakia offensive in early August, according to Human Rights Watch, rebel forces killed at least 190 civilians in several Alawite villages including at least 67 civilians unlawfully killed or executed. As of October 2013, they continue to hold 200 people, mostly women and children, as hostages.
 On 21 August, Syrian activists reported that government forces struck Jobar, Zamalka, 'Ain Tirma, and Hazzah in the Eastern Ghouta region with chemical weapons. Estimated death tolls ranged from 281 to 1,729 fatalities.
 On 10 September, rebels attacked the Alawite village of Maksar al-Hesan, in Homs province, reportedly killing 22 civilians, including women, children and elderly men. 16 of the dead were Alawites while six were Arab Bedouins. Rebels later admitted to the killing of 30 civilians overall in three Alawite villages, includes those in Maksar al-Hesan.
 On 19 September, a rebel bombing targeting one or two buses in Homs province left between 14 and 19 Alawite civilians dead.
 Between 21 and 28 October, during the Battle of Sadad, rebels reportedly committed a massacre. The bodies of 46 civilians, including 15 women, were discovered in Sadad after the rebels pulled back. The opposition activist group the SOHR called it a massacre. 30 of the dead were reportedly found in two mass graves. Another 10 civilians remained missing. This was the worst massacre of Christians to date during the war. 
 On 30 November, a barrel bomb was dropped by a helicopter in Al Bab, Aleppo killing at least 20 people 
 On 6 December, during the Battle of Qalamoun, government forces reportedly killed at least 18 people, including children, in an underground shelter in the government-held Al-Fattah district of An-Nabk. The opposition claimed that government troops torched the bodies after the killings "in a bid to conceal their crime". The next day, the number of those killed was updated to 40.
 On 11 December, the rebel Islamic Front and Al-Nusra Front groups infiltrated the industrial area of the town of Adra, northeast of Damascus, attacking buildings housing workers and their families. The rebels targeted Alawites, Druze, Christians and Shiites, killing them on a sectarian basis. Some people were shot while others were beheaded. The killings lasted into the next day. In all some 19–40 minority civilians were massacred, as the rebels captured the industrial part of Adra. 18 pro-government militiamen were also killed, including five PLA members. Several rebels died when a Shiite man blew himself up along with them and his family after the rebels attempted to kill them. On 13 December, the military surrounded Adra and started an operation to push out rebel fighters from the area. By 15 December, the number of minority civilians confirmed killed in the rebel attack on Adra had risen to 32. Dozens of others were missing. The Syrian military claimed more than 80 people were killed by Islamic rebels.
 Between 15 and 28 December, a series of Army helicopter attacks with barrel bombs against rebel-held areas of Aleppo left 517 people dead, including 151 children, 46 women and 46 rebels, according to the SOHR. 76 of those killed died on the first day alone, while 93–100 people were killed on 22 December. By 18 December 879 people were wounded. During the first four days the attacks were concentrated on Aleppo city, but on 19 December, the helicopter strikes were expanded to include surrounding villages. A rebel commander claimed that by 26 December, more than 1,000 people had been killed in the bombing campaign. By the end of 6 January, the death toll in the bombings had risen to 603, including 172 children, 54 women and 52 rebels. On 9 January, aid groups stated more than 700 people had been killed since the start of the bombing campaign.

2014
 On 9 February 2014, rebels of the Jund al-Aqsa group attacked and captured the Alawite village of Maan, in Hama province, reportedly killing 21 civilians, 10 of them from a single family, during the takeover of the village, according to the SOHR. 20 pro-government militiamen were also killed in the attack. Syrian government sources announced the death of around 60 civilians killed by the Saudi-backed Islamic Front.
 On 18 February 2014, a barrel bomb was dropped by a helicopter in Muzayrib, Daraa killing at least 18 people, 16 of them were Palestinian refugees.
 In mid-August Islamic State fighters massacred some 700 people, mostly men, of the Shu'aytat tribe in Deir ez-Zor Governorate. The death toll was updated in mid-December to more than 900 after the discovery of a mass grave containing 230 bodies.
 On 28 August 2014, Islamic State militants massacred dozens of captured Syrian soldiers near Tabqa. The footage, which was posted on YouTube, showed prisoners stripped to their underwear being marched across the desert. ISIS claimed to have executed 250 prisoners, while SOHR put the death toll at 120.

2015
 On 21 February, according to the SOHR monitoring group, at least 48 people were killed in Rityan when Syrian government forces executed six families of rebel fighters.
 On 15 March, according to Aranews, at least 20 people were killed and hundreds others wounded after government warplanes bombarded the residential neighborhoods in Duma city in the eastern Ghouta of Damascus. Medical sources from field hospitals in the city reported that victims included women and children, adding that the airstrikes caused mass destruction of several residential buildings.
 On 28 March, during the Second Battle of Idlib, it was reported by the SOHR, that Syrian forces had executed 15 prisoners who were being held at the military intelligence headquarters.
 On 31 March, Islamic State militants killed 46–48 civilians in the village of Mabuja, in Hama province, before the Army managed to repel their attack. The subsequent fighting also left 6–31 soldiers and reportedly 40 militants dead. The victims were either shot dead, burned or stabbed.
 On 25 April, during the 2015 Northwestern Syria offensive, 23 prisoners were executed by Syrian government forces before their withdrawal from the area of the National Hospital in Jisr al-Shughur, according to the SOHR monitoring group.
 On 28 April, it was reported that Islamic State militants had executed a total of 2,154 people since 28 June 2014, with 1,362 being civilians, 529 government soldiers, 137 rebels and 126 Islamic State deserters.
 During the Palmyra offensive, on 14 May and 15 May, 49 people were executed by ISIL forces in Amiriya and al-Sukhnah. Following the battle on 22 May, various pro-opposition sources in the city reported ISIL had executed between 150 and up to 280 government loyalists and soldiers in the streets, while Syrian state TV put the number at 400 killed.
 On 29 May, during the Al-Hasakah offensive, according to the SOHR, YPG forces executed at least 20 civilians accused of supporting ISIL in the village of Abo Shakhat. The SOHR also reported that 30 civilians were killed by ISIL forces while trying to escape fighting in Nis Tal on the Syrian–Turkish border.
 On 11 June, the Al-Nusra Front killed at least 20 Druze villagers in Qalb Lawzeh in Idlib province.
 On 26 June, ISIL fighters entered the city of Kobane dressed up as YPG fighters and starting to shoot at civilians. More than 200 civilians were killed.
 On 16 August, the Syrian Air Force launched strikes on the rebel-held town of Douma, northeast of Damascus, killing at least 96 civilians and injuring at least 200 others.
 On 15 September 38 people, including 14 children, were killed by rebel rocket fire on government-held district of Aleppo.
 On 17 September, government helicopters dropped barrel bombs in FSA-held Bosra that struck a busy market place packed with shoppers and people buying necessities for children returning to school that week, killing between 17 and 24.
 On 30 October, at least 65 people were killed and 250 injured in government airstrikes targeting a marketplace in the city of Douma.

2016
 On 16 January, between 135 and 300 civilians are killed and 400 kidnapped in Deir ez-Zor after ISIL took control of the northern suburbs of the city.
 On 20 March, ISIL killed more than 20 Kurdish and Arab civilians in the eastern Aleppo town of Kafr Saghir.
 Between 22 April and 18 July, bombardment across Aleppo city left 914 civilians dead. Mutual bombardment between both government and rebel forces killed 878 (525 by government air-strikes and shelling, and 353 by rebel shelling). 23 civilians died due to rebel shelling of a Kurdish-held area of the city. Six civilians died due to Kurdish sniper fire. 7 civilians also died when a rebel mortar shell plant exploded.
 On 5 May, 30 people died in the Kamuna refugee camp massacre.
 On 12 May, at least 19 civilians were killed by the Al-Nusra Front and Ahrar al-Sham in the Alawite village of Zarah, in Hama province. 100 others were reportedly kidnapped. After negotiations by the Syrian Red Crescent, the bodies of 42 civilians were recovered from the town on 25 May.

2017
 On 4 April, the Syrian government killed at least 89 people and injured 541 others in the Khan Shaykhun chemical attack.
 On 30 April, at least 11 people were killed after the Syrian Air Force dropped a barrel bomb near Daraa. Four children were reportedly among the dead.
 On 26 September, as many as 70–80 people were killed in the desert by Syrian government forces, according to witnesses.
 On 29 September, airstrikes killed at least 34 people in the Armanaz massacre.
 On 13 November, Russian Air Force conducted an airstrike with unguided bombs on a crowded market in Atarib, resulting in 84 deaths.

2018
 On 29 January, at least 33 people were killed by Syrian government airstrikes.
 On 4 February 16 civilians were killed after the Syrian government dropped two barrel bombs in the northern Idlib province.
 Between 5 and 8 February, Syrian government forces killed 213 civilians in eastern Ghouta, including 54 children and 41 women, according to the Syrian Observatory for Human Rights. An additional 700 civilians were injured in the attacks.
 Between 18 and 22 February, at least 417 people have been killed in eastern Ghouta, including 96 children, according to the Syrian Observatory for Human Rights. More than 2,100 people have been wounded. Planes have struck residential areas and, according to medical charities, hit more than a dozen hospitals, making it near impossible to treat the wounded. On 1 March, the Syrian Civil Defense reported that 674 civilians were killed in eastern Ghouta since 18 February.
 On 7 April, at least 70 people were killed in a chemical attack in Douma.
 On 25 July, a string of suicide bombings and gun attacks took place in and around As-Suwayda, killing at least 258 people and injuring 180 others.

2019
 On 20 November, Qah was struck by a ground-to-ground missile from the Assad regime with Russian and Iranian support. It killed at least 15 people, including six children.

See also
 List of massacres in Syria
 List of Syrian Civil War barrel bomb attacks
 Use of chemical weapons in the Syrian civil war

References

History of Homs Governorate
Syrian Civil War
Massacres